The seventh season of the American television series Arrow premiered on The CW on October 15, 2018, and concluded on May 13, 2019, with a total of 22 episodes. The series is based on the DC Comics character Green Arrow, a costumed crime-fighter created by Mort Weisinger and George Papp, and is set in the Arrowverse, sharing continuity with other Arrowverse television series. The showrunner for this season was Beth Schwartz. Stephen Amell stars as Oliver Queen, with principal cast members David Ramsey as John Diggle, Emily Bett Rickards as Felicity Smoak, Echo Kellum as Curtis Holt, Rick Gonzalez as Rene Ramirez, Juliana Harkavy as Dinah Drake, and Katie Cassidy Rodgers as Laurel Lance also returning from previous seasons. Colton Haynes, a principal cast member for seasons two and three and a special guest actor for seasons four and six, was reinstated as a series regular for the seventh season as Roy Harper. They are joined by Kirk Acevedo as Ricardo Diaz, who was promoted to a series regular from his recurring status in the previous season, and new cast member Sea Shimooka.

The series follows billionaire playboy Oliver Queen (Stephen Amell), who claimed to have spent five years shipwrecked on Lian Yu, a mysterious island in the North China Sea, before returning home to Starling City (later renamed "Star City") to fight crime and corruption as a secret vigilante whose weapon of choice is a bow and arrow. In the seventh season, five months after Oliver's imprisonment, Diaz has recruited the Longbow Hunters, consisting of Kodiak (Michael Jonsson), Silencer (Miranda Edwards), and Red Dart (Holly Elissa Dignard) for a new criminal agenda, including seeking revenge on Oliver's loved ones and allies. After Oliver is released from prison, taking down Diaz in the process, he and the former members of Team Arrow are deputized and begin working alongside the police. Another hooded archer, later revealed to be Oliver's half-sister, Emiko Queen (Sea Shimooka), emerges as the new Green Arrow, seemingly to fight crime on Oliver's behalf. However, Emiko is revealed to be the leader of the Ninth Circle, a terrorist group that begins launching several attacks upon Star City, and is seeking to destroy Oliver's legacy as the Green Arrow. The season features flash-forwards twenty years into the future to Oliver's now adult son William (Ben Lewis) who seeks out Roy Harper on Lian Yu, where they discover instructions left by Felicity leading them back to Star City. There they discover more secrets, including Oliver and Felicity's hidden daughter, Mia (Katherine McNamara), while they work to save the city from another attack.

The series was renewed for its seventh season on April 2, 2018, and filming began in Vancouver, British Columbia, Canada on July 6, 2018, and ended on April 11, 2019. The season featured the directorial debut of cast member David Ramsey. This season includes the fifth annual Arrowverse crossover with TV series The Flash and Supergirl. The season was released on DVD and Blu-ray on August 20, 2019. The series was renewed for an eighth and final season on January 31, 2019.

Episodes

Cast and characters

Main
 Stephen Amell as Oliver Queen / Green Arrow / Flash
 David Ramsey as John Diggle / Spartan
 Emily Bett Rickards as Felicity Smoak / Overwatch
 Echo Kellum as Curtis Holt / Mr. Terrific
 Rick Gonzalez as Rene Ramirez / Wild Dog
 Juliana Harkavy as Dinah Drake / Black Canary
 Colton Haynes as Roy Harper / Arsenal
 Kirk Acevedo as Ricardo Diaz / Dragon
 Sea Shimooka as Emiko Queen
 Katie Cassidy Rodgers as Laurel Lance / Black Siren / Black Canary

Recurring

 Michael Jai White as Ben Turner / Bronze Tiger
 Vinnie Jones as Danny Brickwell
 Cody Runnels as Derek Sampson
 Jack Moore as William Clayton 
 Ben Lewis as adult William Clayton
 Brendan Fletcher as Stanley Dover / Star City Slayer 
 Eliza Faria as Zoe Ramirez 
 Andrea Sixtos as adult Zoe Ramirez 
 Holly Elissa as Red Dart 
 Miranda Edwards as Honor / Silencer 
 Michael Jonsson as Bear / Kodiak 
 Audrey Marie Anderson as Lyla Michaels 
 Laara Sadiq as Emily Pollard 
 Katherine McNamara as Mia Smoak / Blackstar 
 Raj Paul as Keven Dale 
 Joseph David-Jones as adult Connor Hawke 
 Adrian Paul as Dante 
 Kacey Rohl as Alena Whitlock

Guest

Production

Development
At the Television Critics Association winter press tour in January 2018, The CW president Mark Pedowitz said he was "optimistic" and "confident" about Arrow and the other Arrowverse shows returning next season, but added that it was too soon to announce anything just yet. On April 2, The CW renewed the series for its seventh season. Marc Guggenheim and Wendy Mericle stepped down as showrunners at the end of the sixth season, with veteran writer Beth Schwartz taking over as sole showrunner for the seventh season. Guggenheim, the series' co-developer, remains involved as an executive consultant.

Writing
In May 2018, outgoing showrunner Marc Guggenheim revealed that the Longbow Hunters, a villainous organization in DC Comics, would be teased in the sixth-season finale before being introduced in the seventh season. Following the conclusion of the sixth season, which marked the first time in the series' history where the season's main antagonist was still at large, Guggenheim's successor Beth Schwartz confirmed that Ricardo Diaz / Dragon would return and, like his comic book counterpart, establish the Longbow Hunters, "a legendary group of assassins Diaz recruits to get back at Team Arrow for toppling his nascent criminal empire at the end of season 6."

Schwartz revealed that "redemption" would be the theme of the seventh season, "since last season when Oliver outed his identity, the city is a little bit mixed about how they feel about the Green Arrow." Stephen Amell commented that there is "nothing about [Oliver] that's heroic" in the season premiere. While Schwartz confirmed that other characters would be influenced by the season's theme, she stated that after Black Siren committed several murders during her partnership with Diaz, she still has "a large way to go to redeem herself from last season." The previous season also left off with Team Arrow fractured and divided. This season sees its members redefining their roles and what it means to be heroes to an anti-vigilante Star City, while honoring "the sacrifice Oliver made for them." The showrunner named Felicity's storyline as one of her favorites for the season's first half. "We played her pretty parallel to Oliver, where she's hiding and not being herself. She's in protective custody, but when someone attacks her family, she can't ignore that, so she has to fight back." Schwartz also said that the season would be "grounded" and have a "dark" tone, similar to that of the first season.

The seventh season is the first time the series will employ a female-dominated writing staff, with new writers being introduced this season. Schwartz said the seventh season would not be based on David S. Goyer's scrapped film Green Arrow: Escape From Super Max, which would have featured Oliver Queen being arrested, exposed as the Green Arrow, and attempting a prison escape. Amell reported that the season would employ a new storytelling technique. This was later revealed to be sporadic flashforwards, as opposed to the weekly flashbacks of seasons past. Schwartz named Westworld and This Is Us as inspirations for the time structure, and Prison Break as an inspiration for the prison arc. Amell also revealed that he requested that the seventh season be written as if it were the series' last.

Casting
Main cast members Stephen Amell, David Ramsey, Emily Bett Rickards, Echo Kellum, Rick Gonzalez, Juliana Harkavy, and Katie Cassidy Rodgers return from previous seasons as Oliver Queen / Green Arrow, John Diggle / Spartan, Felicity Smoak / Overwatch, Curtis Holt / Mr. Terrific, Rene Ramirez / Wild Dog, Dinah Drake / Black Canary, and Laurel Lance / Black Siren, respectively. The seventh season is the first not to feature original cast members Willa Holland and Paul Blackthorne, who play Thea Queen / Speedy and Quentin Lance, respectively, as series regulars following both actors' departures during the previous season. They did, however, reprise their roles for the series' 150th episode. On April 9, 2018, it was announced that Colton Haynes would return as a series regular for the seventh season after previously starring in the second and third seasons and making guest appearances in the fourth and sixth seasons as Roy Harper / Arsenal. On October 11, Kirk Acevedo was promoted to series regular status after previously recurring in the sixth season as main antagonist, Ricardo Diaz / Dragon. Sea Shimooka was introduced as a series regular during the season, playing Oliver's half-sister Emiko Queen. Kellum exited the series during the season, with the episode "Star City Slayer" marking his final appearance as a series regular. Acevedo also exited the series during the season, with the episode "Brothers & Sisters" marking his final appearance as a regular. On March 30, 2019, Rickards posted on Instagram that she would be leaving the series, making the seventh season her last as a member of the main cast. Series co-creator Greg Berlanti and Schwartz confirmed her departure later that day.

On July 21 at the series' San Diego Comic-Con 2018 panel, it was announced that the Longbow Hunters had been cast with Holly Elissa as Red Dart, Miranda Edwards as Silencer, and Michael Jonsson as Kodiak. It was also revealed that Michael Jai White, Vinnie Jones, and Cody Runnels would additionally recur as Ben Turner, Danny Brickwell, and Derek Sampson from previous seasons. On September 21, Katherine McNamara was cast in a recurring role as Maya, though her character was later revealed to be Oliver and Felicity's future daughter, Mia Smoak / Blackstar. Jack Moore returned in the role of Oliver's son William Clayton, with Ben Lewis portraying the character in flashforwards. Joseph David-Jones also recurs as Connor Hawke, John's adoptive son, in flashforwards. David-Jones previously played an alternate future version of John's biological son John Diggle, Jr., who went by Connor Hawke / Green Arrow, in the Legends of Tomorrow first season episode "Star City 2046". Aiden Stoxx portrays the character as a child in the present. In March 2019, Adrian Paul joined the series in a recurring role as Dante.

Filming
Production for the season began on July 6, 2018, in Vancouver, British Columbia, Canada. In May 2018, Stephen Amell revealed that co-star David Ramsey would direct the eleventh episode of the season, marking Ramsey's directorial debut. Amell also grew a beard during the filming hiatus to accurately resemble the Green Arrow of the comics. Production wrapped on April 11, 2019.

Arrowverse tie-ins
In May 2018, Stephen Amell announced at The CW upfronts that the next Arrowverse crossover would feature Batwoman and Gotham City. The crossover "Elseworlds" is slated to launch a 2019 solo series for the character. The episode "Emerald Archer" featured appearances from Grant Gustin and Caity Lotz as Barry Allen and Sara Lance, respectively, for the series' 150th episode. Joseph David-Jones reprises his role as Connor Hawke from the Legends of Tomorrow episode "Star City 2046" where the character becomes the new Green Arrow in an alternate timeline.

Marketing
The main cast of the season as well as executive producer Beth Schwartz attended San Diego Comic-Con on July 21, 2018 to promote the season.

Release

Broadcast
In May 2018, it was announced that Arrow would move to Mondays for its seventh season, a first for the series, due to The CW's programming expansion to Sunday nights. On June 20, the network released its fall schedule, revealing that the series would additionally move from the 9:00 pm time-slot to the 8:00 pm time-slot. The season began airing in the United States on The CW on October 15, 2018, and completed its 22-episode run on May 13, 2019.

Home media
The season was released on DVD and Blu-ray on August 20, 2019 with special features including the fifth annual Arrowverse crossover event titled "Elseworlds".

Reception

Critical response
The review aggregation website Rotten Tomatoes reports an 88% approval rating for the seventh season, with an average rating of 7.36/10 based on 211 reviews. The site's critics consensus reads, "Arrow recovers from a creative rut by throwing Oliver Queen in the slammer and letting the series' reliable ensemble blossom into the forefront."

Reviewing for Den of Geek, Delia Harrington gave the premiere a rating of 3/5. She opined that Roy's inclusion in the season made his "moving sendoff" with Thea from last season feel "cheap" and that she remained "cautious" about the flashforward structure, but said that the episode was "solid" nonetheless. She concluded, "The Arrow Season 7 premiere manages to both wipe the slate clean and nod in the direction of the show's early glory." IGNs Jesse Schedeen wrote, "Arrows Season 7 premiere kicks off the most significant status quo change in the series' history. Some of these sweeping changes are already working in the show's favor." He gave the episode a rating of 7.1/10, adding, "Arrows seventh season has a promising start, though the premiere drags whenever Oliver Queen isn't the focus." Both Chancellor Agard of Entertainment Weekly and Allison Shoemaker of The A.V. Club gave the premiere a "B" grade and noted a comparison to ABC's Lost, with Agard praising Amell and Rickards' performances. Shoemaker explained that the episode "revisits a lot of familiar territory, but it breaks new ground for Arrow while having its priorities in precisely the right place. It's the beginning of a new era for Arrow, and whether you credit this episode's success to either focus or flash-forwards, it's a promising start."

Ratings

Accolades

|-
! scope="row" rowspan="5" | 2019
| Leo Awards
| Best Stunt Coordination Dramatic Series
| data-sort-value="Robinson, Jeff" | Jeff Robinson, Eli Zagoudakis ("The Slabside Redemption")
| 
| 
|-
| rowspan="3" | Teen Choice Awards
| Choice Action TV Actor
| data-sort-value="Amell, Stephen" | Stephen Amell
| 
| 
|-
| Choice Action TV Actress
| data-sort-value="Rickards, Emily Bett" | Emily Bett Rickards
| 
| 
|-
| Choice Action TV Show
| data-sort-value="Arrow" | Arrow
| 
| 
|-
| Saturn Awards
| Best Superhero Television Series
| data-sort-value="Arrow" | Arrow
| 
| 
|}

Notes

References

External links 

 
 

Arrow (TV series) seasons
2018 American television seasons
2019 American television seasons